Engeddia is a genus of parasitic flies in the family Tachinidae.

Species
Engeddia hispanica Tschorsnig, 1991
Engeddia multisetosa Kugler, 1977

References

Diptera of Europe
Diptera of Asia
Dexiinae
Tachinidae genera